The Billboard Music Award winners and nominees for Top Soundtrack:. Notable winners include the Titanic soundtrack, High School Musical Soundtrack, and Frozen Soundtrack. The only person to win and get nominated was Celine Dion for the Titanic soundtrack. In 2017, Hamilton became the first Cast album to win.

Winners and nominees

References

Billboard awards